Gonzalo Diéguez y Redondo (1897–1955) was a Spanish diplomatist.

Career
In 1920 he entered the foreign service of the Kingdom of Spain.
He was employed in Sète and Perpignan, Guatemala, Oslo and Sidi Bel Abbès.
On 16 August 1927 he was Secritary of the Conference in Lisbon, where a Spanish-Portuguese agreement was signed, which establishes the conditions for the hydroelectric exploitation of the Douro.
From 1933 to January 1948 he had Exequatur as Consul General in Rosario, Santa Fe (Argentina).
From January 1948 to May 1949 he had Exequatur as Consul General in Jerusalem with personal rang as Minister Plenipotentiary 3rd class.
From  to  he was Minister of legation/ ambassador in Amman.

Decorations 
 Great Cross of the Order of Civil Merit (1952)

References

1890s births
1955 deaths
Ambassadors of Spain to Jordan
Spanish diplomats